Mui Airport  is an airstrip serving the village of Mui in Ethiopia.

See also
Transport in Ethiopia

References

 OurAirports - Ethiopia
  Great Circle Mapper - Mui
 Google Earth

Airports in Ethiopia